Presto may refer to:

Computing
 Presto (browser engine), an engine previously used in the Opera web browser 
 Presto (operating system), a Linux-based OS by Xandros
 Presto (SQL query engine), a distributed query engine
 Presto (animation software), the in-house proprietary 3D animation software created and used by Disney and Pixar

Music
 Presto (music), a fast tempo marking
 Presto (album), or the title track, 1989 
 "Presto" (song), by No Money Enterprise, 2020
 Presto! Recording Studios, a studio in Nebraska, United States

Companies and organizations
 Presto (restaurant technology platform)
 Presto (streaming company), an Australian streaming company
 Presto (UK supermarket), a grocery chain in the U.K. from the 1960s to 1998
 Presto! Recording Studios, in Lincoln, Nebraska
 Presto Studios, a computer game development company
 National Presto Industries, manufacturer of kitchen appliances
 Great Taste Coffee Makers, a.k.a. Presto, a Philippine Basketball Association team

Transportation
 Presto, later name of the tug Empire Sara
 Rinspeed Presto, a Swiss concept car
 Hyundai Excel, a car also known as the Hyundai Presto in South Korea
 Presto card, a smart card payment system used in Ontario

Other uses
 Presto (film), a 2008 short film by Pixar
 Presto, Bolivia, a town in Bolivia
 Presto, Pennsylvania, an unincorporated community in the United States
 Presto!, an ATM network owned by Publix Super Markets
 Presto, a pseudonym of Jonathan Swift; see Chelsea Bun House
 Earl "Presto" Johnson, American magician
 Alice S. Presto, American suffragist and politician